Gary Connell (birth registered first ¼ 1959) is an English former professional rugby league footballer who played in the 1970s and 1980s.

Playing career

County Cup Final appearances
Gary Connell played left-, i.e. number 8, in Castleford's 2–13 defeat by Hull F.C. in the 1983 Yorkshire County Cup Final during the 1983–84 season at Elland Road, Leeds, on Saturday 15 October 1983.

References

External links

1959 births
Living people
Castleford Tigers players
English rugby league players
Rugby league players from Pontefract
Rugby league props
Rugby league second-rows